Fort San is a resort village in the Canadian province of Saskatchewan within Census Division No. 6. It is on the shores of Echo Lake of the Fishing Lakes in the Rural Municipality of North Qu'Appelle No. 187.

Prior to becoming a resort village, Fort San was originally a sanatorium. Following the closure of the sanatorium, the area was first repurposed as a venue to house the Saskatchewan Summer School of the Arts. The resort village now houses the Echo Valley Conference Centre.

History 

Fort San incorporated as a resort village on September 1, 1987.

Seventy years earlier, Fort San was opened as a sanatorium in 1917 during a time when tuberculosis infections were increasing. The facility was built to house 358 patients. It was a self-sufficient institution with vegetable gardens, livestock, a power house, and an extensive library for patients provided by World War I veterans.

Saskatchewan Summer School of the Arts 
After tuberculosis became less of a threat in the early 1960s, the sanatorium building's purpose was changed to house the Saskatchewan Summer School of the Arts in 1967. For thirty years, thousands of young people received summer tuition in dance, music, visual art, writing and theatre. Through the 1970s the facilities were expanded and improved to support the school over its 30 years. "Over 1,200 children and adults attended the seven-week program at the School during the summer of 1968." 
The school was closed in 1991 due to lack of funding.  The Sage Hill Writing Experience is one of the spin-offs of the school that continued to operate using a variety of venues around the province. Existing facilities were expanded and improved throughout the 1970s as the popularity of the School increased.

HMCS Qu'Appelle Cadet Summer Training Centre 
Fort San was run as a Royal Canadian Sea Cadet Camp named  HMCS Qu'Appelle Cadet Summer Training Centre during the summers of the nineties to 2004.  The programs offered were:
 Music
 Sailing
 General Training

One of the operating rooms was even converted to a 4 bunk barrack room and the cadets taking sailing or general training generally slept directly over the morgue.

It is an urban legend that Fort San is haunted by patients who died there in its early years. Several authors have documented different accounts of strange occurrences which transpired in the time since it was decommissioned as a sanatorium.

Echo Valley Conference Centre 
The Echo Valley Conference Centre, a provincial government run conference facility is operated out of the historic building on the site.  The conference centre makes use of  Arts and Craft/Tudor Revival style building built from 1912 to 1922 for use by the sanitarium. On September 30, 2004 a decision was made by the Saskatchewan Property Management Corporation to shut down the Centre and offer it for sale.

Demographics 

Government 
The Resort Village of Fort San is governed by an elected municipal council and an appointed administrator that meets on the third Tuesday of every month. The mayor is Blair Walkington and its administrator is Victor Goodman.

See also 
List of communities in Saskatchewan
List of municipalities in Saskatchewan
List of resort villages in Saskatchewan
List of villages in Saskatchewan
List of summer villages in Alberta

References

External links 

Resort villages in Saskatchewan
North Qu'Appelle No. 187, Saskatchewan
Division No. 6, Saskatchewan
Hospital buildings completed in 1917
Reportedly haunted locations in Saskatchewan
Tuberculosis sanatoria in Canada